Keelan Lebon (born 4 July 1997) is a French professional footballer who plays as a winger for Neftçi.

Career

Club
On 10 August 2022, Astana announced the signing of Lebon. On 19 January 2023, Astana announced that Lebon had left the club by mutual consent, signing with Azerbaijan Premier League club Neftçi on an 18-month contract later the same day.

References

External links
 

French footballers
Association football midfielders
Championnat National players
Championnat National 3 players
First Professional Football League (Bulgaria) players
Paris FC players
FC Chambly Oise players
FC Utrecht players
Gazélec Ajaccio players
US Créteil-Lusitanos players
PFC Beroe Stara Zagora players
French expatriate footballers
French expatriate sportspeople in Bulgaria
Expatriate footballers in Bulgaria
1997 births
Living people